is a 1957 black-and-white Japanese historical drama film directed by Kōzaburō Yoshimura. The film had originally been planned by Kenji Mizoguchi, who had adapted several stories by Saikaku Ihara into a script. After Mizoguchi's death, the project was assigned to Yoshimura.

Cast
 Raizo Ichikawa as Keizaburō
 Nakamura Ganjirō II as Nihei
 Chieko Naniwa as Ofude
 Kyōko Kagawa as Onatsu
 Shintaro Katsu as Ichinosuke
 Michiko Ono as Takino
 Narutoshi Hayashi as Kichitarō
 Tamao Nakamura as Ayagi
 Eijirō Tōno as Gonzaemon Hoshino
 Kyū Sazanka as Kawachiya

References

External links
 
 

1957 drama films
Japanese historical drama films
Japanese black-and-white films
Films directed by Kōzaburō Yoshimura
Daiei Film films
Films based on works by Japanese writers
Films scored by Akira Ifukube
1950s Japanese films